This is a record of Israel at the 1993 World Championships in Athletics.

Men's 400 metres hurdles

Qualifying heats

Men's 20 kilometres walk

Men's triple jump

Qualifying round

Men's high jump

Qualifying round

Men's pole vault

Qualifying round

Men's discus throw

Qualifying round

Men's javelin throw

Qualifying round - Group B

Nations at the 1993 World Championships in Athletics
World Championships in Athletics
1993